Laupen Castle is a castle in the municipality of Laupen of the Canton of Bern in Switzerland.  It is a Swiss heritage site of national significance.

See also
 List of castles in Switzerland

References

External links

Cultural property of national significance in the canton of Bern
Castles in the Canton of Bern
Laupen